Maintenance of Certification (MOC) is a recently implemented and controversial process of physician certification maintenance through one of the 24 approved medical specialty boards of the American Board of Medical Specialties (ABMS) and the 18 approved medical specialty boards of the American Osteopathic Association (AOA). The MOC process is controversial within the medical community, with proponents claiming that it is a voluntary program that improves physician knowledge and demonstrates a commitment to lifelong learning. Critics claim that MOC is an expensive, burdensome, involuntary and clinically irrelevant process that has been created primarily as a money-making scheme for the ABMS and the AOA.

Proponents claim that the Maintenance of Certification program was designed to help physicians keep abreast of advances in their fields, develop better practice systems, and demonstrate a commitment to lifelong learning.

Whether or not the MOC program accomplishes any of these stated goals is a matter of intense debate.

Opponents claim that the Maintenance of Certification program is overly burdensome in both time and expense, reducing time available to spend with both family and patients. The exams have had little relevance to the individual physician's practice requiring tremendous effort to relearn material not useful to daily practice, only useful for passing the board exam. There is no proof that it improves patient care and little to no supporting data except for controversial articles written by board members. Serious questions have been raised regarding Member Board finances.

Starting with Oklahoma, effective 1 November 2016, a growing number States have passed or are considering passage of legislation prohibiting use of participation in Maintenance of Certification as a reason to exclude a physician from hospital staff appointment or from insurance company physician panels.,

Medical community 
Some major medical organizations gain profit from and have expressed support for the Maintenance of Certification program including the following:
 The American Board of Medical Specialties (ABMS)
 The American Osteopathic Association (AOA)
 The American Medical Association (May soon be changing based upon a resolution voted on from the floor at their June 2016 meeting.
 The American Hospital Association (AHA)
 The National Board of Medical Examiners (NBME)
 The Federation of State Medical Boards (FSMB)
 The Council of Medical Specialty Societies (CMSS)
 The Accreditation Council for Graduate Medical Education (ACGME)
 The Association of American Medical Colleges (AAMC)
 The Educational Commission for Foreign Medical Graduates (ECFMG)

Some major medical organizations do not gain profit from and do not support the Maintenance of Certification program, including the following:
Association of American Physicians and Surgeons (AAPS)
 The National Board of Physicians and Surgeons (NBPAS)
Docs 4 Patient Care Foundation (D4PC)
Physicians for Certification Change
Independent Physicians for Patient Independence (IP4PI)

Competencies
The ABMS Program for MOC involves ongoing measurement of six core competencies defined by ABMS and ACGME:
 Practice-based Learning and Improvement
 Patient Care and Procedural Skills
 Systems-based Practice
 Medical Knowledge
 Interpersonal and Communication Skills
 Professionalism

Components 
These competencies, which are the same ones used in the ACGME's Next Accreditation System, are measured in the ABMS Program for MOC within a four-part framework:
 Part I: Professionalism and Professional Standing
 Part II: Lifelong Learning and Self-Assessment
 Part III: Assessment of Knowledge, Judgment, and Skills
 Part IV: Improvement in Medical Practice

Other stakeholders 
Some health plans are implementing programs that recognize and reward physicians who are actively participating in Maintenance of Certification activities. ABMS member boards are actively working with other health care organizations to advance quality initiatives and reduce measurement redundancy through recognition of physicians' Maintenance of Certification program participation. A growing number of hospitals and health systems are beginning to use Maintenance of Certification components to engage physicians in quality improvement. Many hospitals are now endorsing and accepting certification from the National Board of Physicians and Surgeons (NBPAS.org) instead of ABMS board certification.

Studies suggest that board-certified physicians provide improved quality of patient care and better clinical outcomes than those physicians without board certification, including a 15% reduction in mortality rate among heart attack patients treated by board-certified physicians. Considering a recent meta-analysis that shows a decline in physician performance associated with the time elapsed since the physician's initial training, it is essential for physicians to participate in programs such as Maintenance of Certification in order to keep current with medicine's expanding knowledge base and technical advances, and to apply this knowledge to quality improvement in their medical practice. There is, however, no evidence MOC participation has any effect on this alleged age-related decline in performance and no evidence MOC is as good as any other intervention or no intervention. Maintenance of Certification strives to help physicians and other health care stakeholders address the critical need to enhance patient safety and patient care quality. There is no evidence to support any efficacy for maintenance of certification in enhancing patient safety and patient care quality. It is important to recognize the extensive conflicts of interests in studies funded by and performed by ABMS and specialty board employees.

Studies have shown that a physician's ability to independently and accurately self-assess is poor, that more clinical experience does not necessarily lead to better outcomes of care and that fewer than 30% of physicians examine their own performance data and try to improve. The MOC program structure strives to address these concerns with a sound theoretical rationale via the six ACGME competencies framework and a respectable body of scientific evidence, and to address its relationship to patient outcomes, physician performance, validity of the assessment or educational methods utilized and learning or improvement potential. A study presented at the AcademyHealth conference in June 2013 found a correlation between an MOC requirement and reduced cost of care and emergency department visits; this paper is currently under review. There are no data suggesting MOC is in any way superior to a number of self-assessment programs, sponsored by physician specialty societies, that are significantly less expensive than MOC.

See also
 American Board of Medical Specialties (ABMS)
 American Osteopathic Association Bureau of Osteopathic Specialists (AOABOS)

References

External links
 Official ABMS Maintenance of Certification Website
 http://www.changeboardrecert.com
 http://www.nbpas.org National Board of Physicians and Surgeons

Medical credentials